Crinotonia is a genus of shrimp containing the two species C. anastasiae and C. attenuatus.

References

Palaemonoidea